Turnip cake is a Chinese dim sum dish. The less commonly used radish cake is a more accurate name, as Western-style turnips are not used in the dish but rather shredded radish (typically Chinese radish) and plain rice flour. It is traditionally called carrot cake in Singapore.

Turnip cake is commonly served in Cantonese yum cha, usually cut into rectangular slices and sometimes pan-fried before serving. Each pan-fried cake has a thin crunchy layer on the outside from frying, and is soft on the inside. The non-fried version is soft all over. It is one of the standard dishes found in the dim sum cuisine of China as well as in overseas Chinatown restaurants. It is also commonly eaten during Chinese New Year, since the word for radish is a homophone for "good fortune" in the Hokkien language. In Taiwan, turnip cake is also commonly eaten as part of a breakfast.

Names
It is known as "fried carrot cake" or simply "carrot cake" in Southeast Asian countries, as the word for daikon, one of its main ingredients, can also refer to a carrot. There is no connection between this dish and the sweet Western carrot cake. This misnomer gave the title to a popular guidebook on Singapore's street food, There's No Carrot in Carrot Cake, which was written by Ruth Wan, Roger Hiew, and Leslie Tay, published by Epigram Books in 2010.

Preparation
To prepare a turnip cake, roots of Chinese radish are first shredded. Chinese radish, either the white-and-green variety or the all-white variety, is one of the key ingredients since it makes up a large portion of the cake. The other key ingredients are water and rice flour. Corn starch is sometimes added as it aids in binding the cake together, especially when a large number of additional ingredients (see list below) are added. The ingredients are stirred together until combined.

Additional ingredients that provide umami flavouring can be also added. They include diced or minced pieces of:
 Dried shrimp
 Dried shiitake
 Chinese sausage
 Jinhua ham

These flavoring ingredients may first be stir-fried before being added to the radish and flour/starch mixture. Somewhat more luxurious cakes will add larger amounts of these ingredients directly to the mixture. Cheaper variants, especially those sold in dim sum restaurants, will often just have a sprinkling on the top, to keep costs down.

This combined mixture is then poured in a steamer lined with greased aluminum foil or cellophane, and steamed at high heat for 40 to 60 minutes until it solidifies into a gelatinous mass.

For those with allergies to radishes, some recipes substitute turnip for radish.  Taro or pumpkin cakes are other variants to it.

Uses
Although the steamed turnip cakes can be consumed straight with soy sauce, they are commonly cooked again to add additional flavors. For instance, turnip cake can be sliced into rectangular pieces when cooled and then pan-fried until both sides turn golden.  It is served with  chili sauce and/or hoisin sauce on the side as condiments.

Turnip cake can also be stir-fried and made into the dish  chai tow kway.

See also
 Bánh bột chiên
 Taro cake
 Water chestnut cake
 Nian gao
 Chai tow kway
 Radish
 List of steamed foods

References

External links

 Sue-On's Kitchen 

Dim sum
Cantonese cuisine
Hong Kong cuisine
Chinese New Year foods
Vegetable dishes
Steamed foods